The modern constellation Eridanus lies across one of the quadrants symbolized by the White Tiger of the West (西方白虎, Xī Fāng Bái Hǔ), and The Southern Asterisms (近南極星區, Jìnnánjíxīng'ōu), that divide the sky in traditional Chinese uranography.

According to the quadrant, it is possible that the constellation Eridanus is not fully visible. Achernar  (Alpha Eridani) is a bright star in this constellation that may have never been seen in Chinese skies.

The name of the western constellation in modern Chinese is 波江座 (bō jiāng zuò), meaning "the waving river constellation".

Stars
The map of Chinese constellation in constellation Eridanus area consists of :

See also
Traditional Chinese star names
Chinese constellations
List of brightest stars

References

External links
Eridanus – Chinese associations
 香港太空館研究資源
 中國星區、星官及星名英譯表
 天象文學
 台灣自然科學博物館天文教育資訊網
 中國古天文
 中國古代的星象系統

Astronomy in China
Eridanus (constellation)